Bipes may refer to:
 Bipes (lizard), a genus of burrowing lizards with no hind limbs and front limbs reduced to stumps
 Lerista bipes, a skink lizard species in the genus Lerista endemic to Australia
 Nebalia bipes, a species of leptostracan crustacean

See also
 Bipedalism